The Rescue on the River was an 1896 short silent film directed by Georges Méliès.

Production
The film was probably made in May 1896. It was an imitation of Up the River, a short film made by the British film pioneer Robert W. Paul earlier in the same year. The Rescue on the River was Méliès's first experiment with longer forms of cinema: it told a story across two distinct shots, instead of the one-shot format he had used previously. In so doing, it marked a first step away from the brief Lumière-inspired scenes and actuality films with which Méliès had begun his filmmaking career, and toward the more complex films for which he would become known.

Release
The Rescue on the River was released by Méliès's Star Film Company in two parts, numbered 22 and 23, respectively, in the company catalogues. Each part was approximately 20 meters (65 feet) long.

The Rescue on the River is currently presumed lost.

References

External links

Films directed by Georges Méliès
French silent short films
Lost French films
French black-and-white films
1890s lost films
1896 short films
1890s French films